The  (TNSC) is the largest rocket-launch complex in Japan with a total area of about 9.7 square kilometers. It was established in 1969 when the National Space Development Agency of Japan (NASDA) was formed, and is now run by JAXA.

The activities that take place at TNSC include assembly, testing, launching, and tracking satellites, as well as rocket engine firing tests.

Facilities
On-site main facilities include:

 Yoshinobu Launch Complex is a launch site for launch vehicles like the H-IIA
 Vehicle Assembly Building (VAB)
 Second Spacecraft Test and Assembly Building
 Takesaki Range Control Center

Those facilities are used for performing operations from assembling launch vehicles, maintenance, inspections, final checks of satellites, loading satellites onto launch vehicles, rocket launches, and tracking launch vehicles after liftoff. The TNSC plays a pivotal role in satellite launches among Japan’s space development activities.

Orbital launches of the H-IIA rockets take place from the Yoshinobu Launch Complex, lifting off from one of its two launch pads. The H-IIA first stage engine, the LE-7A, is test-fired at the Yoshinobu Firing Test Stand. Auxiliary buildings are in place for the assembly of new spacecraft and for radar and optical tracking of launched spacecraft.

The older Osaki Launch Complex was retired in 1992. It was used for the launch and development of N-I, N-II, and H-I space rockets.

The Space Science and Technology Museum is near TNSC. It offers an intricate view of rocket history and technology in Japan. Though most of the displays are in Japanese, there are English tour pamphlets available.

In fiction
In Empire Earth: The Art of Conquest, in the Asian Campaign, the Tanegashima Space Center is an important location, pivotal in the story to the United Federation of Asian Republics reaching Mars before the Americans or Europeans. The spaceport was completely destroyed in a nuclear bombing raid by Novaya Russia but was rebuilt by the UFAR at the request of their ally, Japan.

Episode 2 of the Japanese animated film 5 Centimeters per Second features a rocket launch from Tanegashima Space Center.

In the Robotics;Notes visual novel, Tanegashima Space Center is one of the major settings found in the game. It is also featured in the anime.

In Captain Earth, Tanegashima Space Center is now controlled by Globe and serves as one of their bases.

In the Japanese animated television series Aldnoah.Zero, Tanegashima is the crash landing site of some Martian technology.

The video games Pokémon Ruby and Sapphire, along with their remakes, feature the Mossdeep Space Center, which is modeled on the Tanegashima Space Center.

In season 2, episode 19 of the Japanese animated television series Assassination Classroom, the students of class 3-E of Kunugigaoka Junior High School infiltrate a space center that is based on Tanegashima Space Center.

In the Japanese animated series Shingu: Secret of the Stellar Wars, Tanegashima figures very prominently in the later episodes.

See also

References

External links

  
  
 Introduction
 Article title
 SLR Global Performance Report Card
 

Spaceports
Space program of Japan
Buildings and structures in Kagoshima Prefecture